The Houston Brookshire–Yeates House at 304 Howe St., East, in Lufkin, Texas is a Tudor Revival house that was built in 1920.  It was designed by prominent local architect Shirley Simons.  It was listed on the National Register of Historic Places in 1988.

It is one of several Tudor Revival buildings designed by Simons in Lufkin;  other NRHP-listed ones are the C. W. Perry Archie–Hallmark House, the A. F. Perry and Myrtle–Pitmann House, and the Bowers–Felts House (c.1928–1937).

See also

National Register of Historic Places listings in Angelina County, Texas

References

Houses on the National Register of Historic Places in Texas
Tudor Revival architecture in Texas
Houses completed in 1920
Houses in Angelina County, Texas
National Register of Historic Places in Angelina County, Texas